Mike Spivey (born March 10, 1954) is a former professional American football defensive back who played in the National Football League (NFL) for the Chicago Bears, Oakland Raiders, New Orleans Saints, and Atlanta Falcons

References

1954 births
Living people
American football safeties
Atlanta Falcons players
Chicago Bears players
Colorado Buffaloes football players
New Orleans Saints players
Oakland Raiders players
Players of American football from Houston